Askhat Tagybergenuly Tagybergen (Ashat Tağybergenūly Tağybergen; born 9 August 1990) is a Kazakh footballer who plays for Tobol in the Kazakhstan Premier League.

Career

Club
Tagybergen signed for FC Astana in February 2016.

On 15 June 2017, Tagybergen returned to FC Astana after a loan with FC Tobol, where he made desultory appearances.

On 9 January 2018, FC Kaisar announced the signing of Tagybergen.

International
Askhat Tagybergen was included in the Kazakhstan team.

Career statistics

Club

International

Statistics accurate as of match played 18 November 2020

References

Living people
1990 births
Kazakhstani footballers
Kazakhstan international footballers
Kazakhstan under-21 international footballers
Kazakhstan Premier League players
FC Kaisar players
FC Astana players
FC Aktobe players
FC Tobol players
Place of birth missing (living people)
Association football midfielders
People from Kyzylorda